is a retired butterfly swimmer from Japan. She competed for her native country at the 1992 Summer Olympics in Barcelona, Spain.

References
 sports-reference

1974 births
Living people
Japanese female butterfly swimmers
Olympic swimmers of Japan
Swimmers at the 1992 Summer Olympics
People from Hamamatsu
Asian Games medalists in swimming
Swimmers at the 1990 Asian Games
Asian Games bronze medalists for Japan

Medalists at the 1990 Asian Games
Universiade medalists in swimming
Asian Games silver medalists for Japan
Universiade gold medalists for Japan
20th-century Japanese women